There have been six baronetcies created for persons with the surname King, one in the Baronetage of Ireland, one in the Baronetage of Great Britain and four in the Baronetage of the United Kingdom. Three of the creations are extant as of 2007.

The King Baronetcy, of Boyle Abbey in the County of Roscommon, was created in the Baronetage of Ireland on 27 September 1682. For more information on this creation, see the Earl of Kingston.

The King, later Duckworth-King Baronetcy, of Bellevue in the County of Kent, was created in the Baronetage of Great Britain on 18 July 1792. For more information on this creation, see Duckworth-King baronets.

The King Baronetcy, of Charlestown in the County of Roscommon, was created in the Baronetage of the United Kingdom on 1 July 1815 for Gilbert King, a descendant of Edward King, Bishop of Elphin.

The King Baronetcy, of Corrard in the County of Fermanagh, was created in the Baronetage of the United Kingdom on 6 November 1821 for Abraham Bradley King. The title became extinct on the death of the third Baronet in 1921.

The King Baronetcy, of Campsie in the County of Stirling, was created in the Baronetage of the United Kingdom on 10 October 1888 for James King, Lord Provost of Glasgow between 1886 and 1889.

The King Baronetcy, of Cornwall Gardens, was created in the Baronetage of the United Kingdom on 21 June 1932 for Henry Seymour King, Member of Parliament for Kingston upon Hull Central from 1885 to 1911. The title became extinct on his death in 1933.

King baronets, of Boyle Abbey (1682)
see Earl of Kingston

King, later Duckworth-King baronets, of Bellevue (1792)
see Duckworth-King baronets

King baronets, of Charlestown (1815)

Sir Gilbert King, 1st Baronet (1746–1818)
Sir Robert King, 2nd Baronet (1785–1825)
Sir Gilbert King, 3rd Baronet (1812–1895)
Sir Gilbert King, 4th Baronet (1846–1920)
Sir George Adolphus King, 5th Baronet (1864–1954)
Sir Alexander William King, 6th Baronet (1892–1969)
Sir Peter Alexander King, 7th Baronet (1928–1973)
Sir Wayne Alexander King, 8th Baronet (born 1962)
The heir apparent to the baronetcy is Peter Richard Donald King (born 1988).

King baronets, of Corrard (1821)
Sir Abraham Bradley King, 1st Baronet (1774–1838)
Sir James Walker King, 2nd Baronet (1796–1874)
Sir Charles Simeon King, 3rd Baronet (1840–1921) married on 1891 Sophia Louisa, daughter and heiress of R. Bolton-Davis, of Swerford Park, Swerford, Oxon.

King baronets, of Campsie (1888)
Sir James King, 1st Baronet (1830–1911)
Sir John Westall King, 2nd Baronet (1863–1940)
Sir James Granville Le Neve King, 3rd Baronet (1898–1989)
Sir John Christopher King, 4th Baronet (1933–2014)
Sir James Rupert King, 5th Baronet (born 1961)

The heir apparent to the baronetcy is the current holder's elder son, John Alistair King (born 1996).

King baronets, of Cornwall Gardens (1932)
Sir Henry Seymour King, 1st Baronet (1852–1933)

Notes

References 
Kidd, Charles, Williamson, David (editors). Debrett's Peerage and Baronetage (1990 edition). New York: St Martin's Press, 1990, 

Baronetcies in the Baronetage of Ireland
Baronetcies in the Baronetage of the United Kingdom
Extinct baronetcies in the Baronetage of the United Kingdom
1682 establishments in Ireland
1815 establishments in the United Kingdom